The Shnokh Hydro Power Plant will be one of Armenia's largest hydro power plant having an installed electric capacity of .

References

External links

Hydroelectric power stations in Armenia
Proposed hydroelectric power stations
Proposed renewable energy power stations in Armenia